Raipur railway division is one of the three railway divisions under South East Central Railway zone of Indian Railways. This railway division was formed on 1 April 2003 and its headquarter is located at Raipur in the state of Chhattisgarh of India.

Nagpur SEC railway division  and Bilaspur railway division are the other two railway divisions under SECR Zone headquartered at Bilaspur.

List of railway stations and towns 
The list includes the stations  under the Raipur railway division and their station category. 

Stations closed for Passengers -

References

 
Divisions of Indian Railways
2003 establishments in Chhattisgarh

Transport in Raipur, Chhattisgarh